Orthocomotis expansa is a species of moth of the family Tortricidae. It is found in Ecuador in Carchi and Morona-Santiago provinces.

References

Moths described in 1999
Orthocomotis